Ginna is an 2022 Indian Telugu-language action comedy film directed by Eeshaan Suryaah, and written by G. Nageswara Reddy and Kona Venkat. It is produced by Mohan Babu, AVA Entertainment and 24 Frames Factory. The film stars Vishnu Manchu, Payal Rajput, Sunny Leone, Vennela Kishore, and Raghu Babu. The film score is composed by Anup Rubens.

Principal photography began in April 2022 and the title Ginna was announced in June 2022. The movie was initially scheduled for 5 October release. However, due to post production delays, it was released on 21 October and received good response and reviews from the audience and critics.

Cast

Music 
The soundtracks, score and music of the film is composed by Anup Rubens and choreography of each different song by Prabhu Deva, Prem Rakshith, and Ganesh Acharya. Ginna's first song was sung by Vishnu's twin daughters Ariaana and Viviana making their singing debut.

Production and release
The film began its production in March 2022 in Hyderabad and Tirupati. The movie was released in Telugu, in addition to dubbed versions in Hindi, Tamil and Malayalam languages simultaneously on 21 October.

Reception
Ronak Kotecha of The Times of India rated the film 3 out of 5 stars and wrote "Ginna is quite a messy/massy affair that doesn't bother about things like logic, great performances and conviction, as long as it can give its audience a good time and a good laugh. And it manages to do that more than once". 123Telugu rated the movie with 3 out of 5 stars with a tag line Timepass Comedy, News18 gave 3 out of 5 stars mentioning Comedy entertainer one time watch. The Hans India rated the film 3 out of 5 stars and wrote "'Ginna' is a complete entertainer and it engaged the audience to have a decent weekend!". Sakshi Post rated the film 2.5 out of 5 stars and wrote "Ginna will surely make you all laugh in some scenes. Overall, a satisfying attempt".

Box office
Ginna ends theatrical run with ₹9.05 crore collections worldwide and collected $75 thousand in US and Canada market. Ginna bhai Hindi language rights sold for record price of ₹10 crores and Ginna is streaming on Amazon_Prime_Video in Telugu and Malayalam languages from 2nd December 2022.

References

External links

Indian romantic action films
Films shot in Hyderabad, India
Films set in Andhra Pradesh
Films shot at Ramoji Film City
2022 films
Indian action comedy films
2020s masala films